Act utilitarianism is a utilitarian theory of ethics that states that a person's act is morally right if and only if it produces the best possible results in that specific situation. Classical utilitarians, including Jeremy Bentham, John Stuart Mill, and Henry Sidgwick, define happiness as pleasure and the absence of pain.

Overview
To understand how act utilitarianism works, compare the consequences of watching television all day tomorrow to the consequences of doing charity work tomorrow. One could produce more overall happiness in the world by doing charity work tomorrow than by watching television all day tomorrow. According to act utilitarianism, then, the right thing to do tomorrow is to go out and do charity work; it is wrong to stay home and watch television all day.

Act utilitarianism is based on the principle of utility, which is the basis of all utilitarian theories and is best summed up in Bentham's well-known phrase, "the greatest happiness for the greatest number". Jeremy Bentham supported his theory with another famous quote of his, that "Nature has placed mankind under two sovereign masters, pain and pleasure. It is for them alone to point out what we ought to do, as well as determine what we shall do." Bentham's utilitarianism is a hedonistic theory and starts with the premise that people are in their very nature hedonistic. This means that he believed people would actively seek out pleasure and avoid pain, if given the opportunity.

Critics sometimes cite such prohibitions on leisure activities as a problem for act utilitarianism. Critics also cite more significant problems, such as the fact that act utilitarianism seems to imply that specific acts of torture or enslavement would be morally permissible if they produced enough happiness.

Act utilitarianism is often contrasted with a different theory called rule utilitarianism. Rule utilitarianism states that the morally right action is the one that is in accordance with a moral rule whose general observance would create the most happiness. Act utilitarianism evaluates an act by its actual consequences whereas rule utilitarianism evaluates an action by the consequences of its general or universal practice (by all other persons, and perhaps into the future and past as well). Rule utilitarianism is sometimes thought to avoid the problems associated with act utilitarianism.

See also

Brad Hooker
Peter Singer
Preference utilitarianism
Two-level utilitarianism

References

Utilitarianism